Group 6 consisted of three of the 32 teams entered into the European zone: Norway, Sweden, and Switzerland. These three teams competed on a home-and-away basis for one of the 8.5 spots in the final tournament allocated to the European zone. The spot would be assigned to the group's winner.

Standings

Matches

Notes

External links 
Group 6 Detailed Results at RSSSF

6
1976 in Norwegian football
1977 in Norwegian football
1976 in Swedish football
1977 in Swedish football
1976–77 in Swiss football
1977–78 in Swiss football